XHESA-FM is a radio station on 101.7 FM in Culiacán, Sinaloa. It is owned by Radiosistema del Noroeste and carries the Exa FM pop format from MVS Radio.

History
XESA-AM received its concession on June 6, 1941. It was owned by Pablos y Elizalde, S. de R.L. and broadcast on 1360 kHz. In 1971, Operadora de Radio de Culiacán, S.A., bought XESA and moved it to 1260 kW, increasing its power from 1,000 to 5,000 watts. XESA migrated to FM in 2011.

References

Radio stations in Sinaloa